Glynn Wynn (1 September 1772 – 23 April 1809) was an English politician.

He was elected at the 1807 general election as a Member of Parliament (MP) for the rotten borough of Westbury in Wiltshire, but died in office two years later, aged 36.

References

External links 
 

1772 births
1809 deaths
Members of the Parliament of the United Kingdom for English constituencies
UK MPs 1807–1812
Onslow family